Poland competed at the 1968 Winter Olympics in Grenoble, France.

Alpine skiing

Men

Men's slalom

Biathlon

Men

 1 One minute added per close miss (a hit in the outer ring), two minutes added per complete miss.

Men's 4 x 7.5 km relay

 2 A penalty loop of 200 metres had to be skied per missed target.

Cross-country skiing

Men

Women

Women's 3 x 5 km relay

Figure skating

Pairs

Luge

Men

(Men's) Doubles

Women

Nordic combined 

Events:
 normal hill ski jumping 
 15 km cross-country skiing

Ski jumping

References
Official Olympic Reports
 Olympic Winter Games 1968, full results by sports-reference.com

Nations at the 1968 Winter Olympics
1968
1968 in Polish sport